The Zagros Mountains (Turkish: Zagros Dağları; Luri: Kuh hā-ye Zāgros کویا زاگرس or کوه یل زاگرس) are a long mountain range in Iran, northern Iraq, and southeastern Turkey. The Zagros mountain range begins in northwestern Iran and roughly follows Iran's western border while covering much of southeastern Turkey and northeastern Iraq. From this border region, the range continues to the southeast under also the waters of the Persian Gulf. It spans the southern parts of the Armenian highland, the whole length of the western and southwestern Iranian plateau, ending at the Strait of Hormuz.

Geology

The Zagros fold and thrust belt was mainly formed by the collision of two tectonic plates, the Eurasian Plate and the Arabian Plate. This collision mainly happened during the Miocene (about 25–5 million years ago or mya) and folded the entirety of the rocks that had been deposited from the Paleozoic (541–242 mya) to the Cenozoic (66 mya – present) in the passive continental margin on the Arabian Plate. However, the obduction of Neotethys oceanic crust during the Cretaceous (145–66 mya), and the continental arc collision in the Eocene (56–34 mya) both had major effects on uplifts in the northeastern parts of the belt.

The process of collision continues to the present, and as the Arabian Plate is being pushed against the Eurasian Plate, the Zagros Mountains and the Iranian plateau are getting higher and higher. Recent GPS measurements in Iran have shown that this collision is still active and the resulting deformation is distributed non-uniformly in the country, mainly taken up in the major mountain belts like Alborz and Zagros. A relatively dense GPS network which covered the Iranian Zagros also proves a high rate of deformation within the Zagros. The GPS results show that the current rate of shortening in the southeast Zagros is ~, dropping to ~ in the northwest Zagros. The north–south Kazerun strike-slip fault divides the Zagros into two distinct zones of deformation. The GPS results also show different shortening directions along the belt, normal shortening in the southeast, and oblique shortening in the northwest Zagros. The Zagros mountains were created around the time of the second ice age, which caused the tectonic collision, leading to its uniqueness.

The sedimentary cover in the SE Zagros is deforming above a layer of rock salt (acting as a ductile decollement with a low basal friction), whereas in the NW Zagros the salt layer is missing or is very thin. This different basal friction is partly responsible for the different topographies on either side of the Kazerun fault. Higher topography and narrower zone of deformation in the NW Zagros is observed whereas in the SE, deformation was spread more and a wider zone of deformation with lower topography was formed. Stresses induced in the Earth's crust by the collision caused extensive folding of the preexisting layered sedimentary rocks. Subsequent erosion removed softer rocks, such as mudstone (rock formed by consolidated mud) and siltstone (a slightly coarser-grained mudstone) while leaving harder rocks, such as limestone (calcium-rich rock consisting of the remains of marine organisms) and dolomite (rocks similar to limestone containing calcium and magnesium). This differential erosion formed the linear ridges of the Zagros Mountains.

The depositional environment and tectonic history of the rocks were conducive to the formation and trapping of petroleum, and the Zagros region is an important area for oil production. Salt domes and salt glaciers are a common feature of the Zagros Mountains. Salt domes are an important target for petroleum exploration, as the impermeable salt frequently traps petroleum beneath other rock layers. There is also much water-soluble gypsum in the region.

Type and age of rock

The mountains are completely of sedimentary origin and are made primarily of limestone. In the Elevated Zagros or the Higher Zagros, the Paleozoic rocks can be found mainly in the upper and higher sections of the peaks of the Zagros Mountains, along the Zagros main fault. On both sides of this fault, there are Mesozoic rocks, a combination of Triassic (252–201 mya) and Jurassic (201–145 mya) rocks that are surrounded by Cretaceous rocks on both sides. The Folded Zagros (the mountains south of the Elevated Zagros and almost parallel to the main Zagros fault) is formed mainly of Tertiary rocks, with the Paleogene (66–23 mya) rocks south of the Cretaceous rocks and then the Neogene (23–2.6 mya) rocks south of the Paleogene rocks.

Iran's main oilfields lie in the western central foothills of the Zagros mountain range. The southern ranges of the Fars Province have somewhat lower summits, reaching . They contain some limestone rocks showing abundant marine fossils.

History

The Zagros Mountains have significant ancient history. They were occupied by early humans since the Lower Paleolithic Period. The earliest human fossils discovered in Zagros belongs to Neanderthals and come from Shanidar Cave, Bisitun Cave, and Wezmeh Cave. The remains of ten Neanderthals, dating from around 65,000–35,000 years ago, have been found in the Shanidar Cave. The cave also contains two later "proto-Neolithic" cemeteries, one of which dates back about 10,600 years and contains 35 individuals. Evidence from later Upper Paleolithic and Epipaleolithic occupations come from Yafteh Cave, Kaldar Cave near Khoramabad, and Warwasi, Malaverd near Kermanshah, Kenacheh Cave in Kurdistan, Boof Cave in Fars and a number of other caves and rock shelters.
Signs of early agriculture date back as far as 9000 BC in the foothills of the mountains. Some settlements later grew into cities, eventually named Anshan and Susa; Jarmo is one archaeological site in this area. Some of the earliest evidence of wine production has been discovered in the mountains; both the settlements of Hajji Firuz Tepe and Godin Tepe have given evidence of wine storage dating between 3500 and 5400 BC.

During early ancient times, the Zagros was the home of peoples such as the later, the Kassites, Guti, Elamites and Mitanni, who periodically invaded the Sumerian and/or Akkadian cities of Mesopotamia. The mountains create a geographic barrier between the Mesopotamian Plain, which is in Iraq, and the Iranian plateau. A small archive of clay tablets detailing the complex interactions of these groups in the early second millennium BC has been found at Tell Shemshara along the Little Zab. Tell Bazmusian, near Shemshara, was occupied between 5000 BCE and 800 CE, although not continuously.

Population
The Zagros mountains have been inhabited by different groups of pastoralists and farmers for thousands of years. Pastoralist groups such as Bakhtiaris, Kurds or Qashqais move from their herds from the east slopes in summer (Yeylāgh) to the west slopes in winter (Gheshlāgh). Some major cities are located on the foothills of the Zagros mountains, including Sulaymaniyah, Kermanshah, Khorramabad, and Shiraz.

Bakhtiaris 
The Bakhtiaris are a Lur tribe from Iran, primarily inhabiting the Central and South Zagros. Major cities inhabitated by Bakhtiaris include Masjed Soleyman, Izeh and Shahr-e Kord. A significant number of Bakhtiari still practice nomadic pastoralism.

Kurds

Kurds are an Iranian ethnic group native to the northwestern Zagros and the eastern Taurus mountain ranges, which spans southeastern Turkey, northwestern Iran, northern Iraq, and northern Syria. The high altitude of the Zagros mountains produces a series of choke points and valleys perfect for agriculture and human development. It has also long defended the Kurds in times of war by acting as a natural barrier.

Qashqai
Qashqai people are a tribal confederation in Iran mostly of Turkic origin. Significant populations can be found in Central and South Zagros, especially around the city of Shiraz in the Fars province.

Climate
The mountains contain several ecosystems. Prominent among them are the forest and forest steppe areas with a semi-arid climate. As defined by the World Wildlife Fund and used in their Wildfinder, the particular terrestrial ecoregion of the mid to high mountain area is Zagros Mountains forest steppe (PA0446). Winters are severe, with low temperatures often below . The region exemplifies the continental variation of the Mediterranean climate pattern, with a snowy winter and mild, rainy spring, followed by a dry summer and autumn.

Glaciation 
The mountains of the East-Zagros, the Kuh-i-Jupar, Kuh-i-Lalezar and Kuh-i-Hezar do not currently have glaciers. Only at Zard Kuh and Dena some glaciers still survive.

Flora and fauna

Although currently degraded through overgrazing and deforestation, the Zagros region is home to a rich and complex flora. Remnants of the originally widespread oak-dominated woodland can still be found, as can the park-like pistachio/almond steppelands. The ancestors of many familiar foods, including wheat, barley, lentil, almond, walnut, pistachio, apricot, plum, pomegranate and grape can be found growing wild throughout the mountains. Quercus brantii (covering more than 50% of the Zagros forest area) is the most important tree species of the Zagros in Iran.

Other floral endemics found within the mountain range include: Allium iranicum, Astragalus crenophila, Bellevalia kurdistanica, Cousinia carduchorum, Cousinia odontolepis, Echinops rectangularis, Erysimum boissieri, Iris barnumiae, Ornithogalum iraqense, Scrophularia atroglandulosa, Scorzonera kurdistanica, Tragopogon rechingeri, and Tulipa kurdica. The Zagros are home to many threatened or endangered organisms, including the Zagros Mountains mouse-like hamster (Calomyscus bailwardi), the Basra reed-warbler (Acrocephalus griseldis) and the striped hyena (Hyena hyena). Luristan newt (Neurergus kaiseri) – vulnerable endemic to the central Zagros mountains of Iran. The Persian fallow deer (Dama dama mesopotamica), an ancient domesticate once thought extinct, was rediscovered in the late 20th century in Khuzestan Province, in the southern Zagros. Also, wild goats can be found almost all over the Zagros mountain range.

In the late 19th century, the Asiatic lion (Panthera leo persica) inhabited the southwestern part of the mountains. It is now extinct in this region.

Religion
The entrance to the ancient Mesopotamian underworld was believed to be located in the Zagros Mountains in the far east. A staircase led down to the gates of the underworld. The underworld itself is usually located even deeper below ground than the Abzu, the body of freshwater which the ancient Mesopotamians believed lay deep beneath the earth.

Gallery

See also

Part of the Zagros Mountains
 Mount Alvand
 Mount Arbaba
 Mount Derak
 Nalishkêne
 Qaleh gorikhteh

Other
 Alborz Mountains
 Al Hajar Mountains, technically a continuation of the Zagros in the Arabian Peninsula
 Armenian highlands
 Battle of the Persian Gate
 Caucasus Mountains
 Corduene / Kurdistan
 Geography of Iran
 Geography of Iraq
 Geography of Turkey
 Iranian plateau
 Mountains of Ararat
 Mount Judi and Noah's Ark
 Silakhor Plain
 Tigris–Euphrates river system

References

External links

 Zagros, Photos from Iran, Livius.
 The genus Dionysia 
 Iran, Timeline of Art History
 Mesopotamia 9000–500 B.C.
 Major Peaks of the Zagros Mountains

 
Mountain ranges of Iran
Mountain ranges of Iraq
Mountain ranges of Turkey
Iranian Plateau
Anatolia
Geography of Iranian Kurdistan
Geography of Iraqi Kurdistan
Geography of Turkish Kurdistan
Upper Mesopotamia
Physiographic provinces
Deforestation in Turkey